Terbium(III) chloride (TbCl3) is a chemical compound. In the solid state TbCl3 has the YCl3 layer structure. Terbium(III) chloride frequently forms a hexahydrate.

Hazards

Terbium(III) chloride causes hyperemia of the iris.
Conditions/substances to avoid are: heat, acids and acid fumes.

References

Chlorides
Lanthanide halides
Terbium compounds